"The Lineman," originally titled "Man, Go Man," is an instrumental composed by Ralph Dollimore. The best-known version of the song is a cover version that was produced by Sam Spence, which has been featured in many NFL Films highlights videos and documentaries.

This song is also predominant in Mermaid Man and Barnacle Boy episodes of SpongeBob SquarePants, usually playing in the title cards.  The song was also played in The Simpsons episode "The Twisted World of Marge Simpson".  It has also been played in an advertisement for the PlayStation JAMPACK demo discs.

Recently, this song has been played in a trailer for the Nickelodeon show Penguins of Madagascar.

This song is also the main theme for the trailer of the DS game Club Penguin: Elite Penguin Force.

This song was also featured in the Sam Spence album Power and Glory: The Original Music & Voice of NFL Films.

The song was briefly heard in the official trailer for Hamster & Gretel.

References 

National Football League music
Instrumentals